Glenbeg Lough is a freshwater lake in the southwest of Ireland. It is located on the Beara Peninsula in County Cork.

Geography

Hydrology
Glenbeg Lough drains into the Ownagappul River, which in turn enters Kenmare Bay at Cappul. The lake is oligotrophic.

Natural history
Fish species in Glenbeg Lough include brown trout, salmon and the critically endangered European eel. The lake is part of the Glanmore Bog Special Area of Conservation.

See also
List of loughs in Ireland

References

Glenbeg